Brigadier John Raymond Broadbent,  (18 February 1893 – 28 February 1972) was a senior Australian Army officer in the Second World War.

Early life
Broadbent, Service Number: NX34728 (N8), was born in Ballarat, Victoria and enlisted in Sydney on 14 June 1940.

Service history
Broadbent held numerous posts during the Second World War, while also acting as a temporary brigadier and was Mentioned in Despatches in 1945. He held the following posts:
1940 – Commanding Officer 7th Light Horse
1940 – General Staff Officer 1 1st Australian Cavalry Division
1940–1941 – Assistant Adjutant & Quartermaster-General 8th Australian Infantry Division [Malaya]
1942 – Deputy Adjutant & Quartermaster-General New Guinea Force
1942–1943 – Deputy Adjutant & Quartermaster-General I Australian Corps [New Guinea]
1943–1944 – Deputy Adjutant & Quartermaster-General II Australian Corps
1944–1945 – Deputy Adjutant & Quartermaster-General I Australian Corps

Honours and awards
Commander of the Order of the British Empire
Mention in Despatches

See also
List of Australian generals and brigadiers

External links

Bio at Steen Ammentorp's www.generals.dk
Service record at WWII Nominal Roll site

References

1893 births
1972 deaths
Australian brigadiers
Australian Commanders of the Order of the British Empire
Australian military personnel of World War I
Australian Army personnel of World War II
People from Ballarat
Quartermasters
Royal Military College, Duntroon graduates
Military personnel from Victoria (Australia)